Krzyżowice may refer to the following places in Poland:
Krzyżowice, Lower Silesian Voivodeship (south-west Poland)
Krzyżowice, Brzeg County in Opole Voivodeship (south-west Poland)
Krzyżowice, Głubczyce County in Opole Voivodeship (south-west Poland)
Krzyżowice, Silesian Voivodeship (south Poland)